Tropidoturris anaglypta is a species of sea snail, a marine gastropod mollusk in the family Borsoniidae.

Description

The size of the shell attains 10 mm.

Distribution
This marine species occurs off KwaZulu-Natal and Zululand, South Africa

References

 Kilburn R.N. (1986). Turridae (Mollusca: Gastropoda) of southern Africa and Mozambique. Part 3. Subfamily Borsoniinae. Annals of the Natal Museum. 27: 633–720.
 Steyn, D.G. & Lussi, M. (1998) Marine Shells of South Africa. An Illustrated Collector’s Guide to Beached Shells. Ekogilde Publishers, Hartebeespoort, South Africa, ii + 264 pp. page(s): 156

External links
 

Endemic fauna of South Africa
anaglypta
Gastropods described in 1986